Prison Song may refer to:

Films and television
 Prison Song (film), a 2001 American film
Music
 Prison rock, a musical subgenre of Chinese rock 'n' roll
 "Prison Song", a song by Graham Nash from the album Wild Tales
 "Prison Song", a song by System of a Down from the album Toxicity

See also 
:Category:Songs about prison